Batumi Archaeological Museum is an archaeological museum in the city of Batumi in  Adjara, Georgia. It is one of the oldest museums in Georgia.

See also
 List of museums in Georgia (country)

References 

Museums in Batumi
Archaeological museums